Origin is an American science fiction drama series created by Mika Watkins that premiered on November 14, 2018, on YouTube Premium. Watkins also serves as a writer for the series and executive produces alongside Andy Harries, Rob Bullock, Suzanne Mackie, Josh Appelbaum, André Nemec, Jeff Pinkner, and Scott Rosenberg. On March 25, 2019, YouTube cancelled the series after one season.

Premise
Origin follows "a group of strangers stranded on a spacecraft bound for a distant planet. The abandoned passengers must work together for survival, but quickly realize that one of them is far from who they claim to be."

Cast and characters

Main
 Natalia Tena as Lana Pierce
 Tom Felton as Logan Maine
 Sen Mitsuji as Shun Kenzaki
 Nora Arnezeder as Evelyn Rey
 Adelayo Adedayo as Agnes "Lee" Lebachi
 Fraser James as Dr. Henri Gasana
 Philipp Christopher as Baum Arndt
 Madalyn Horcher as Abigail Garcia
 Siobhán Cullen as Katie Devlin

Recurring
 Wil Coban as Max Taylor
 Jóhannes Haukur Jóhannesson as Eric Carlson
 Nina Wadia as Venisha Gupta
 Maurice Carpede as Anthony Frost
 Clayton Evertson as Alan Young
 David Sakurai as Murakawa
 Hiromoto Ida as Hideto Yagami
 Aidan Whytock as Jonas Arends
 Millie Davis as Ruby Touré
 Ray Fearon as Omar Touré
 Nic Rasenti as Mike Gore

Guest
 Tara Fitzgerald as Xavia Grey ("The Road Not Taken")
 Anna Skellern as Jennifer Moore ("Bright Star")
 Belén Fabra as Captain Sanchez ("Bright Star")
 Jamie Quinn as Crosby ("Bright Star")
 Nathalie Boltt as Laura Kassman ("God's Grandeur")
 Aglaia Szyszkowitz as Margo Von Platen ("Fire and Ice")
Anthony Paul as Caspar Von Platen ("Fire and Ice")
 Francis Chouler as Police Guard ("Fire and Ice")
 Togo Igawa as Eiichi Yagami ("The Wasteland")
 Fionnula Flanagan as Mia Anderson ("Funeral Blues")
 Alana Boden as Ayko ("Remember Me")
 Daniel Arreola ("Bright Star")

Episodes

Production

Development
On October 26, 2017, it was announced that YouTube had given the production a series order for a first season consisting of ten episodes set to premiere in 2018. The series was created by Mika Watkins who was also expected to serve as a writer and executive producer alongside Andy Harries, Rob Bullock, and Suzanne Mackie from Left Bank and Josh Appelbaum, André Nemec, Jeff Pinkner and Scott Rosenberg. Production companies involved with the series were slated to consist of Midnight Radio, Left Bank Pictures, CiTVC, and Sony Pictures Television.

On January 24, 2018, it was reported that the series would premiere sometime around the end of 2018. On April 26, 2018, it was announced that Paul W. S. Anderson would direct the series' first two episodes. On August 27, 2018, it was announced on the show's official Twitter account that the series would premiere on November 14, 2018. On March 25, 2019, it was confirmed that YouTube had cancelled the series.

Casting
On April 26, 2018, it was announced that Natalia Tena, Tom Felton, Sen Mitsuji, Nora Arnezeder, Fraser James, Philipp Christopher, Madalyn Horcher, and Siobhán Cullen had been cast as series regulars and that Adelayo Adedayo, Nina Wadia, Johannes Johannesson, Wil Coban, and Tara Fitzgerald would also appear in the series.

Filming
Principal photography for the series took place in 2018 in South Africa.

Release
On July 19, 2018, a teaser trailer for the series was released. On October 4, 2018, the first full-length trailer was released.

Reception
On the review aggregation website Rotten Tomatoes, the series was holding a 69% approval rating with an average rating of 6.2 out of 10 based on 16 reviews. The website's critical consensus reads, "Origins overstuffed space drama mimics many genre classics to varying degrees of success; thankfully, its stellar cast and withholding premise are intriguing enough to encourage exploring its mysterious -- if familiar -- corridors."

References

External links
Official YouTube Channel

2018 American television series debuts
2018 American television series endings
2010s American drama television series
English-language television shows
2010s American science fiction television series
Space adventure television series
YouTube Premium original series
Television shows filmed in South Africa
Television series by Sony Pictures Television
Television series by Left Bank Pictures
American science fiction web series
Television series about extraterrestrial life
2010s American LGBT-related television series
Lesbian-related television shows